Bona is a 1980 Filipino drama film directed by Lino Brocka, with the film's lead character, Bona, played by acclaimed actress Nora Aunor. It was submitted as an entry to the Metro Manila Film Festival that same year. 

Bona was also shown at the Directors' Fortnight of the 1981 Cannes International Film Festival, marking Brocka's second appearance at the festival. Bona also gave Aunor her second Gawad Urian best actress trophy.

Cast
Nora Aunor as Bona
Phillip Salvador as Gardo
Raquel Montesa as Nancy
Rustica Carpio as Bona's mother
Marissa Delgado as Katrina
Venchito Galvez as Bona's father
Nanding Josef as Nilo
Spanky Manikan as Bona's brother
 Archi Adamos as Tambay
 Rene Hawkins as Rene
 Joel Lamangan as Director
 The PETA Kalinangan Ensemble

Reviews
Bona has been considered as one of the Philippines' greatest movies. It was also cited as one of "The Best 100 Films in the World" by the Museum of Tolerance in Los Angeles, USA in 1997 and has been screened in different film festivals around the world, albeit receiving mixed reviews.

It was also screened at the 47th Viennale: Vienna International Film Festival, where Barbara Wurm, Berlin- and Vienna-based film historian, critic, and programmer, described Philippine cinema's Superstar as “the awesome Nora Aunor.”

The Philippine Educational Theater Association staged an adaptation of the film from August 24 to September 23, 2012, at the Peta Theater Center. The adaptation was written by Layeta Bucoy and directed by Socrates "Soxie" Topacio. Eugene Domingo played Bona while Edgar Allan Guzman played Gino Sanchez, the stage counterpart of the film's Gardo.

Accolades

Festivals
1980 - Official Selection, Directors’ Fortnight, Cannes International Film Festival
1980 - Official Selection, Critics’ Choice Section, 25th London Film Festival, November 12
1981 - Official Selection, Filipino Cinema Panorama, 3rd Festival Des 3 Continents, Nantes, December 1–8
1996 - Fest96: The AFI Los Angeles International Film Festival, October 26
1999 - Feature Film: Tribute to Asian Master Lino Brocka, Telluride Film Festival
2005 - Official Selection, Lino Brocka Retrospective, 23rd Torino Film Festival, November 15

References

Furthering reading
Tobias, Mel. One hundred acclaimed Tagalog movies. Canada: Peanut Butter Publishing, 1998.

External links
 

1980 films
Philippine drama films
1980 drama films
Films directed by Lino Brocka